Lesley Varner II (born April 29, 1998) is an American professional basketball player for UBSC Graz of the Austrian Basketball Superliga. He played college basketball for the Texas–Rio Grande Valley Vaqueros.

Early life and high school career
Varner attended Cedar Hill High School. During his senior season, he guided the team to a 25–7 record and 11th ranking in Texas. Varner committed to play college basketball at Texas–Rio Grande Valley, turning down offers from Arkansas–Pine Bluff, UC Riverside, and Milwaukee. He stated that he knew Texas–Rio Grande Valley was a good fit after his visit, and he connected with coach Lew Hill.

College career
After posting his first double-double with 14 points and 11 rebounds in an 85–77 win against Chicago State, Varner was named WAC player of the week on January 24, 2017. Varner averaged 11.2 points, 5.4 rebounds, and 1.4 steals per game as a junior. On December 3, 2019, he scored 33 points and had 13 rebounds, both career-highs, while tying his career-high with five steals in a 90–86 overtime win against Sam Houston State. As a senior, Varner averaged 15.6 points, 6.0 rebounds, 1.7 assists and 1.5 steals per game, while shooting 43.3 percent from the field. He was named to the First Team All-WAC. Varner finished his career with 1,182 points, 16th highest in school history.

Professional career
Varner signed his first professional contract with UBSC Graz of the Austrian Basketball Superliga on August 26, 2021.

Career statistics

College

|-
| style="text-align:left;"| 2016–17 
| style="text-align:left;"| Texas–Rio Grande Valley 
|| 32 || 3 || 14.8 || .357 || .276 || .647 || 2.3 || .9 || .8 || .2 || 4.1
|-
| style="text-align:left;"| 2017–18
| style="text-align:left;"| Texas–Rio Grande Valley 
|| 33 || 5 || 16.9 || .374 || .269 || .714 || 3.2 || .6 || 1.0 || .3 || 5.1
|-
| style="text-align:left;"| 2018–19
| style="text-align:left;"| Texas–Rio Grande Valley
|| 37 || 37 || 26.1 || .469 || .290 || .633 || 5.4 || 1.1 || 1.4 || .4 || 11.2
|-
| style="text-align:left;"| 2019–20
| style="text-align:left;"| Texas–Rio Grande Valley
|| 30 || 30 || 28.0 || .433 || .406 || .871 || 6.0 || 1.7 || 1.5 || .3 || 15.6
|- class="sortbottom"
| style="text-align:center;" colspan="2"| Career
|| 132 || 75 || 21.5 || .426 || .322 || .736 || 4.2 || 1.1 || 1.2 || .3 || 8.9

References

External links
Texas–Rio Grande Valley Vaqueros bio

1998 births
Living people
American men's basketball players
Basketball players from Texas
People from Cedar Hill, Texas
Small forwards
Sportspeople from the Dallas–Fort Worth metroplex
UT Rio Grande Valley Vaqueros men's basketball players